The Mickiewicz Battalion was a volunteer battalion of the International Brigades during the Spanish Civil War. It formed part of the XIII International Brigade from 27 October 1937 until 23 September 1938, when the International Brigades were disbanded. It was named after Adam Mickiewicz (1798–1855), a Polish poet and patriot.

In July 1938 The Battalion took part in the Battle of the Ebro crossing the river and initially advancing quickly attacking and capturing many Nationalist troops at La Venta de Camposines, before moving on to near Gandesa. By September 1938 they were dug in defending a difficult position on the road from Corbera d'Ebre under constant bombardment and machine gun fire, the only respite being at night. They continued to dig trenches and lay barbed wire. After an artillery bombardment, the Battalion continued a heroic defence against tanks and cavalry which saw many of their best men killed, before the order for withdrawal came.

Personnel
Franek Ksiezarczyk - commander
Mieczyslaw Schleyen - political commissar
Zygmunt Molojec

References

Military units and formations established in 1937
Military units and formations disestablished in 1938
International Brigades
Adam Mickiewicz
Military history of Poland